A list of Romanian films released in 1993.

1993

External links

1993
Romanian